The Ethiopian montane forests is a tropical moist broadleaf forest ecoregion in eastern Africa. It covers the middle elevations of the Ethiopian Highlands in Ethiopia and extends into neighboring Eritrea, Sudan, Djibouti, and Somaliland. The ecoregion includes distinctive Afromontane forests, woodlands, grasslands, and shrublands. The ecoregion's biodiversity is threatened by deforestation, conversion to agriculture, and overgrazing.

Geography
The Ethiopian montane forests lie between 1,100 and 1,800 meters elevation. They extend throughout the middle elevations of the Ethiopian Highlands, which are mostly in Ethiopia and reach into neighboring Eritrea and Somaliland. The ecoregion also includes several outlying mountains, including Jebel Elba, Jebel Hadai Aweb, and Jebel Ower in eastern Sudan, and the Goda and Mabla mountains in Djibouti. The montane forests are bounded at lower elevations by tropical grasslands and savannas on the west and southwest, and deserts and dry shrublands on the east and southeast.

Above 1800 meters, the montane forests transition to the Ethiopian montane grasslands and woodlands, which are home to distinct higher-elevation forests, woodlands, and grasslands.

Climate
Moisture-bearing winds from the Red Sea provide rainfall throughout the year. The highlands generate orographic precipitation, and are generally cooler and more humid than the lower-elevation deserts and dry shrublands that bound the highlands on the east and south. Orographic effects create fog and cloud cover which keep humidity high and help sustain forests. Southwesterly winds bring rainfall from May to October. Average annual rainfall varies with location, from 600 to 1500 mm. The southern and southwestern portions of the ecoregion generally have higher rainfall.

Flora
The montane forest belt has several natural plant communities, including closed-canopy forests and open-canopied woodlands interspersed with grassland, savanna, and shrubland. The ecoregion's Afromontane flora includes species distinct to Africa's highland regions, often mixed with typical lowland species. In most of the ecoregion the natural vegetation has been heavily altered by livestock grazing, conversion to agriculture, and plantations of exotic trees.

Kolla is an open woodland found at lower elevations. Characteristic trees are species of Terminalia, Commiphora, Boswellia, and Acacia. 

Areas of the south and west with higher rainfall are home to Afromontane rain forests and Afromontane moist transitional forests. Characteristic trees of the highlands' Afromontane rain forests include Diospyros abyssinica, Mitragyna rubrostipulata, Macaranga capensis, Ochna holstii, Olea capensis, Pouteria adolfi-friedericii, Prunus africana, and Syzygium guineense, along with the tree ferns Cyathea dregei and Cyathea manniana.

The lower portions of the Harenna Forest in the southern highlands includes a distinct woodland community, with an open canopy of Warburgia ugandensis, Croton macrostachyus, Syzygium guineense, and Afrocarpus gracilior, and wild coffee (Coffea arabica) as the dominant understory shrub.

Fauna
Native birds include Harwood's spurfowl (Pternistis harwoodi), Ruspoli's turaco (Menelikornis ruspolii), and yellow-throated seedeater (Crithagra flavigula), which are endemic to the Ethiopian Highlands.

Protected areas
7.43% of the ecoregion is in protected areas. These include portions of several of Ethiopia's national parks – Arsi Mountains, Awash, Nechisar, Omo, Chebera Churhura, Borena, and Maze. Two UNESCO-designated biosphere reserves, Kafa and Yayu, cover portions of the western highlands. Eritrea's Yob Wildlife Reserve and Erkawit Wildlife Sanctuary also protect portions of the ecoregion.

References

Afrotropical ecoregions
Tropical and subtropical moist broadleaf forests
Ecoregions of Ethiopia
Ecoregions of Djibouti
Ecoregions of Eritrea
Ecoregions of Sudan
Ecoregions of Somalia
Forests of Ethiopia
Afromontane ecoregions
Afromontane forests
Ecoregions of Somaliland